This list is of the Cultural Properties of Japan designated in the category of  for the Prefecture of Shimane.

National Cultural Properties
As of 25 February 2016, ten Important Cultural Properties have been designated, being of national significance.

Prefectural Cultural Properties
As of 25 February 2016, thirty-six properties have been designated at a prefectural level.

Municipal Cultural Properties
Properties designated at a municipal level include:

See also
 Cultural Properties of Japan
 List of National Treasures of Japan (paintings)
 Japanese painting

References

External links
  Cultural Properties in Shimane Prefecture

Cultural Properties,Shimane
Cultural Properties,Paintings
Paintings,Shimane
Lists of paintings